Ipak may refer to:

 İpək (disambiguation), places in Azerbaijan
 Ipak, Iran
 Ipak, Rahim Shahriari's album